Moonlight Resonance (Traditional Chinese: 溏心風暴之家好月圓) is a 2008 grand production HDTV drama by TVB. It is a spiritual sequel to 2007's award-winning series, Heart of Greed featuring most of the original cast members. The series is written and edited by Cheung Wah-biu and Sit Ga-wah. Sponsored by Kee Wah Bakery, the series began broadcast on 28 July 2008. It stars Louise Lee , Ha Yu , Michelle Yim , Susanna Kwan , Moses Chan, Linda Chung and Raymond Lam. Its final episode was one of the highest rated TVB episodes in the 2000s decade at 50 points. The series was met with critical acclaim, with praise to the intense plot, excellent performances by the cast, and moving storyline. It went on to receive various awards and is one of the highest-rated TVB series in viewership in the 2000s.

Plot

Chung Siu-Hor, discovered that her husband Gan Tai-Cho was having an affair with their employee Yan-Hung. Siu-Hor and Tai-Cho owned a confectionery together known as the Moonlight Bakery. Yan-Hung forces Siu-Hor and Tai-Cho to declare divorce.

After this divorce, Yan-Hung and Tai-Cho take on the Moonlight Bakery name and prove successful, resulting in a family asset totaling HK$1 billion. Meanwhile, Siu-Hor struggles to make a living at the modest bakery she once owned with Tai-Cho. Over the next ten years, Yan-Hung manipulates the family to keep relations hostile.

When Yan-Hung has a miscarriage with Tai-Cho's baby, she blames Wing-Yuen to make him feel indebted to her. Meanwhile, Siu-Hor's sister Chung Siu-Sa comes to Hong Kong after divorcing her husband. Siu-Sa is very angry that Siu-Hor let Tai-Cho take the Moonlight Bakery name and decides to sue Yun-Hung and Tai-Cho for the Moonlight Bakery franchise. However, Siu-Sa ultimately loses the court case.

Wing-Ka lacks interest in managing the bakery; instead, he is addicted to the stock market. With Siu-Hor and Hou-Yuet's encouragement and support, he is able to quit gambling. Wing-Ka eventually falls for his cousin, Siu-Sa's daughter, Ka Mei.

When she comes back, the two fall in love again. However, the appearance of Dr. Ling Chi Shun causes So-Sum to abandon her feelings for Wing-Ho. She and Chi-Shun begin a relationship, but as it turns out, Chi-Shun already has a girlfriend named Wing-Lam. Despite Chi-Shun not having feelings for Wing-Lam, he feels indebted to her because she had helped him so much in the past.

However, she sees how concerned her family is about her and apologizes and returns home. Later, she begins developing feelings for Wing-Ka, however the appearance of Ka Mei causes Yuet to become jealous.

Wing-Yuen is the one child that sided with Yun-Hung, due to him believing that he was the one who caused her miscarriage. After breaking up with Wing-Ka, Ka Mei begins dating Wing-Yuen, despite the protest of his siblings and mother. He later has a baby with Ka Mei, but, unsure if it is his, Ka Mei gets an abortion to avoid complications.

Wing-Ho constantly tells her to find a real job, and she finally gets a job as an office clerk. There she meets Kelvin, who begins to fall for her. Initially, Kelvin's mother is against the relationship, but she eventually accepts Wing-Hing and allows them to get married.

Wing-Chung was separated from his family at a young age, being sent with So-Sum to England. His grades were very poor and he did not like university. Siu-Hor, seeing how much her son dislikes school, allows him to drop out.

Yan-Hung becomes jealous and finally decides to take legal action against Siu-Hor and Tai-Cho, wanting to take 90% of the family assets, leaving them with a mere 10%. To prevent Gwan-Lai from gathering evidence for the court case, Yan-Hung kills her. Despite losing the lawsuit, the family is still very happy. Wanting to destroy their happiness, Yan-Hung tells Ka Mei to hold a meeting to reveal that Wing-Yuen killed someone. However, seeing the error of her ways, Ka Mei instead reveals the Yan-Hung killed Sheh Gwan-Lai.

Due to the turn of events, Yan Hung faces murder charges. She tries to convince So Sum to lie and give false testimony and So Sum pretends to agree. Yan Hung later gives Sum 70% of her shares of the Moonlight Bakery as a present for So Sum and Dr. Ling's "marriage". Sum subsequently returns the shares to Tai Cho and Siu Hor and tells Yan Hung she will tell the truth behind Gwan Lai's death. Yan Hung is convicted and sentenced, while Tai Cho tells her that he will give her 50% of the shares once she finishes her jail sentence. Wing Ho and So Sum finally get together, while Hou Yuet marries Wing Ka. In a scene taking place four years in the future, it is revealed that Wing Ka is alive in his late thirties. Yan Hung, now living abroad in New Zealand, refuses to take her half of Moonlight Bakery's shares and approves of So Sum and Wing Ho's relationship.

Production

Development
TVB's 2007 series, Heart of Greed, was successful enough to commission this series. In June 2007, Louise Lee presented on the Heart of Greed (溏心) chatroom that the producers had already begun to write another series with the same actors but a different story line. Details about the new series were leaked by the media in October 2007 and Lau Kar Ho, the director, writer and producer of the series, vowed to catch the person who leaked this information because few people knew about the new series. The sales presentation clip was released on 19 November 2007. The clip gave clues about the new series which featured Michelle Yim as the new villain and a mooncake business instead of the abalone business in Heart of Greed. New cast members included Kate Tsui, Lee Heung Kam, Vincent Wan and Wayne Lai.

On 28 January 2008, the cast celebrated their kick-off in filming, which included a costume fitting. Lee, Raymond Lam and Fala Chen had to attend baking lessons in order for them to film baking scenes realistically. Filming commenced on 14 February 2008, where Lee, Lai and Lam were the first to shoot at a bakery. The main cast and Lau Kar Ho celebrated the blessing ceremony of the series on 7 March 2008. The release of its official trailer was aired at the Shanghai Television Festival on 11 June. Principal filming ended on 1 July 2008, and its official English title was revealed. TVB officially began promotional and advertising work on the series on 5 July 2008, with an advertisement being aired followed up with its official website being released on 8 July 2008.

Music
The opening theme song for the series Mo Sam Hoi Ni (無心害你) was performed by Susanna Kwan, while the ending song Ai Bu Kau (愛不疚) was performed by Raymond Lam and was featured in his album Your Love. The ending theme was nominated as one of the top-10 song of the 31st RTHK Top 10 Gold Songs Awards. A featured song for the series entitled "Ice Cream (Talk to Me)" was written and produced by London-based production team DNR DNR who are better known as The Slips.

Casting dilemma
Wayne Lai was originally cast as the character who would eventually become the husband for Susanna Kwan's character. However, Lai explained on the celebrity talk show Be My Guest that due to health problems, the role was offered to Louis Yuen instead. Lai took over the part of the baker Nin Tze Yung, which Yuen was originally assigned to.

Cast

Chung Household

Gan Household

Others

Characters

The Elders
Gan Tai Cho - Tai Cho is a loving and witty man. In 1996, he was tricked by his employee Yan Hung into having an affair with her, which causes his and Siu Hor's happy marriage to abruptly end. Although for 10 years he did not really care about Hor, he is always worried about his children and tries his best to spend time with them. During the series, Cho admits his mistakes, asks all the children for their forgiveness, and tries to make it up to Hor. Soon, Cho and Hor go through a lot together and memories of their past together resurface. After many long years, Cho finally gets the confidence to stand up to Hung, and during the two-hour finale, he officially reunites with Hor.
Chung Siu Hor - Hor is an honest, kind, independent and loving woman. Although very uncompassionate to Hung, Hor is very loving to Cho, even after he had an affair, stole the bakery name, and forcefully took three of the children. In the beginning of the series, we see Hor and her children struggling to maintain the bakery, getting by with just enough to spare. Although Hor spends much time managing the bakery, she also puts a great deal of time into raising her children and caring for her father. She is very admired by her children, including the children who followed Cho. She is very happy when Cho finally admits his mistakes and happily agrees to remarry him when he gets a chance.
Yan Hung - Hung is a petty, greedy, cunning, and dishonest woman. She started out as a young worker from the countryside with no knowledge of urban technology (like the telephone). Eventually she found her way to the Moonlight Bakery and found work there as a dish washer. As time passed, Hung became better educated and became one of Moonlight Bakery's most talented and well-loved employees. It was Hung who started the affair with Cho and caused the Kam household to split up. Once Cho and Hor are divorced, Hong deliberately manipulated the family by fueling arguments between the two sides. She also steals the Moonlight Bakery trademark, and with Cho, expands the bakery throughout Hong Kong, making over one billion Hong Kong dollars. After Cho and Hor patch things up with each other and Jo gets back in touch with his children, Hong continually tries to keep him away from Hor's family. Hong even kills her mother in law when she tries to reveal all the bad things Hung has done. Eventually Hung is arrested and sent to jail for manslaughter. Yu So Sum, more commonly known as Yu So Tsau, is Hung's daughter from her first husband.
Salina Chung Siu Sa - Sa is Hor's younger sister. In the beginning and middle of the series she is a caring but mean and greedy woman who was abandoned by her husband in Portugal and had no choice but to return to Hong Kong. Sa resembles her sister in some ways, but not in others. Like Hor, she is smart, caring, and straightforward, but unlike her, she is mean, unwilling to just forget, talks too much, and will do anything for money. Towards the middle of the series everyone discovers that she is adopted and she gets kicked out of the house having become tired of her trouble-making and greediness. This experience changes her life, and she realizes how awful she had been to people. She begs for forgiveness and is let back into the family. Sa becomes very defensive of her sister and cares about her a lot. Sa marries Yuen Yan Chi during the series. Lo Ka Mei (Camie) is Sa's adopted daughter (revealed via webcam). Many people skip the webcam episode and conclude that she and Camie are blood-related.
Sheh Gwan Lai - She is Cho's mother. Gwan Lai is an old, loving grandmother who cares very deeply for her son and all her grandchildren, especially Ah Ho, who is her favourite grandchild. Even though she can get very grumpy sometimes, her grandchildren still love her because they understand that she's old and cannot get out her emotions any other way when she feels bad. Willing to use her life to save Cho's or her grandchildren's lives. Grandma refuses to eat, drink or take her medicine multiple times during the series when they persist in doing things she does not approve of. She starts out in the series hating Hor to the gut, but as Hung's evil schemes are slowly revealed, Grandma learns to admit her misunderstandings and her relationship with Hor improves. When Hung gives up on Cho and creates a secret scheme to steal profits from the company, grandma finds out and reveals it to Cho, Hor, and the children. Near the end of the series, when she prepares evidence against Hung for the court case, Hung pushes grandma down the stairs and she was subsequently killed.
Chung Fan Dat - Grandpa is Hor's father. An old grandfather who, like Grandma, cares very much about his daughter and grandchildren. He has always been there when Hor or her children need him the most. He resembles Grandma in the sense that they both will do anything for their children or grandchildren. It was Grandpa who came up with the name "Moonlight Bakery"("Ka Ho Yuet Yuen"). When the two families entangled in the shop brand name lawsuit, Grandpa gathers all his friends, the bakery employees, Hor's friends, and all the grandchildren who followed Hor to sue Cho and Hung. Cho and Hung win the case and keep the name 'Moonlight Bakery". Eventually he learns to accept back Cho when he admits his mistakes and turns himself around.
Sheh Lai Mui and Mak Yau Gung - Mui is Grandma's twin sister and resembles her caring, firm ways. Gung is Sheh's son and a total opposite to her. Both are blackmailed by Hung to work for her due to their constant insecure status in the family. Eventually both free themselves and Gung opens his own small business.
Yuen Yan Chi - Yan Chi is Siu Sa's second husband. He first met her at a dance in Fontainhas was office manager at Ga Mei's dancing school and also her private dance teacher. Although he is ten years younger than Sa, they still married because they were in love and Yan Chi cared about Ka Mei. Educated, funny and caring, he is at first well liked by the family. During the big court case, they almost get divorced because he says in court that Jo and Hor were likely having an affair, but when Sa goes to the hospital and throws the wedding ring at him when he comes to see her, he repents and is punished by having to find her ring. For the rest of the series they are on good terms and everything is well.

The Children
Gam Wing Ka - Ka is Cho and Hor's eldest son and the oldest of the children. When Cho and Hor split up the children, Hor begged Ka to look after the children who went with Cho and make sure they did not turn bad. Sadly, Hung's evil ways made this impossible. In the beginning of the series, Ka is very addicted to the stock market and gambling; it was Hung who bribed Hor's good friend Lin Chi Yung into getting Ka into it. However, with the help of Hor and his adoptive sister Suen Hou Yuet, Ka learns to resist and end his addiction. Throughout much of the series, Ka has an affair with his boss Eliza, whom he always bothers in a flirty way. Ka resembles Cho and Hor the sense that they all care a lot about the family. Later it is revealed that Ka has a heart problem and the chance of him living past age 35 is low. Soon after he falls in love with Hou Yuet, and soon she develops feelings for him, too. Years later, it is revealed that Ka, now in his late thirties, will survive, has married Yuet, and has had two children by her.
Gam Wing Ho - Ho is Cho and Hor's second son. After the divorce he fell under the custody of his mother, Hor, and along with his sisters Yuet and Hing, helps his mother at the bakery. Ho takes up the role of a father as well as an elder son in the Chung household and resembles Hor in almost every way. Since childhood, he had been entangled in a love relationship with Hung's daughter Yu So Sum. After the divorce, they continued to date each other, often by going on the ferry, until Hung forced Sum to study in England, when Ho and Sum were forced to break up. Ten years later, they got back together, although they were just in a brother-sister relationship. At the end of the series, Ho and Sum officially get back together, fall in love, and get married.
 Suen Hou Yuet - Yuet is Cho and Hor's adopted daughter. Yuet is the daughter of one of Cho and Hor's close neighborhood family friends, but was abandoned by her single mother at the age of 2. Feeling sorry for her, and sensing he knew the reason her mother was forced to abandon her daughter, Grandpa took Yuet in. Cho and Hor, knowing the mother and daughter well, decided to adopt her. Yuet is a very bright, straightforward, and independent girl who left her family two times to live on her own throughout the series. During most of the beginning of the series, Yuet was constantly taunted (later teased) by Sa, who called her "Lor Mui" (Adopted Girl). Yuet is very close to Ka. It was mostly her efforts that helped Ka to stop gambling and investing because she bit him on the arm. At the end of the series she marries Ka and has two children with him.
Gam Wing Yuen - Yuen is an innocent, smart, forgiving figure. When Cho and Hor divorced, Yuen followed Cho. As a child he continuously sneaked back to Hor by himself, every time only to be sent back by Hor. He excels to become a successful person who has studied abroad and holds an advanced degree in business. He is blackmailed by Hung to help her because she lied that he caused her to miscarriage and she also made Yuen look like he bribed police officers to release him when he took drugs, was drunk and while driving in such a state, ran over a woman. Towards the middle of the series Yuen is made GM of Moonlight Resonance Bakery. Later in the series Hung recruits Ka Mei as Yuen's personal assistant, and eventually they fall in love and get married. Towards the end of the series Cho releases Yuen from Hung's control by revealing what Yuen did, and explaining how Hung committed crimes by blackmailing him. During the court trial in which Hung tries to take over Moonlight Resonance Bakery, Yuen and Ka Mei get into arguments and separate for a while. The series ends with Yuen and Ka Mei getting back together when she reveals the truth behind their Grandma's death.
Gam Wing Hing - Hing is Cho and Hor's daughter. She is famous in the series for her role as the "Mute Girl". Physically unable to speak, she talks to her family and co-workers using sign language. Very loving and devoted to her family, she gave up her chance to go to college so that she could stay and work with Hor at the bakery. However, as she really did not like working at the bakery, she managed to get a job as a secretary, which Ho helped translate for her during the job interview. With her charming personality and hard working character, Hing soon earned the friendship and respect of everyone around her, especially Cheng Ga Lok, who became her boyfriend and eventually her husband. She and Ga Lok have a child at the end of the show.
Gam Wing Chung - Hor and Cho's youngest son. When he was only 9, he was taken to Manchester to boarding school just to keep Hung's daughter, Yu So Sum, company. He was spoiled by Hung and was given a house near Chinatown, two BMWs and a Mercedes Benz. He soon ran away from school and left Manchester to go back to Hor because his grades were bad, even admitting himself that he lacks sufficient ability to learn, but was still forced to study by Hung. Hor encouraged Chung to work hard on his talents, rowing and computer programming. He soon got used to his siblings which he missed since childhood. Chung is known as the "Illiterate Boy". Since he was sent to England when he was only 9, he had no chance to learn Chinese. In England, Hung just dumped him in Chinatown with the other British Chinese boys, so he did not learn sufficient English, either. After returning to Hong Kong, his siblings encouraged him and he quickly picked up both languages perfectly. At the end of the series, he became the bakery's administration department computer programmer/IT specialist.
Yu So Sum (Yu So Tsau) - Tsau is Hung's daughter from her first husband. Tsau is a very peaceful, elegant, filial, and smart girl who has emerged from being the daughter of country chicken farmers to a doctor who has studied in England and lives and works in Hong Kong. As Hung was very close to Cho and Hor when they were still married, Cho and Hor took Tsau (with Hung's permission) as their goddaughter and because of this Tsau virtually grew up with the kids; her nickname "Tsau" comes from Grandpa's wish for seven grandchildren, each with names from part of the phrase "家好月圓慶中秋 Ga Ho Yuet Yuen, Hing Chung Tsau". At a young age she fell in love with Ho and for years dated him on the ferry. After the divorce, Tsau continued dating until Hung sent her to England to study when Tsau and Ho were forced to break up. After she returned, she reunited with Ho but they did not start dating again, instead they just had a sworn brother-sister relationship. As she is the daughter of Yan Hung, she always get stuck between 2 families. She helped Hor's family a few times when her mother frames them for something they did not do. Finally feeling her and her mother owes Jo and Hor too much, at the last episode, she transfers her 70% of shares her mother had given her. In the series, she continually goes back and forth between Ho and Ling, always turning to Ho whenever she is feeling down. At the end of the series Tsau finally gets out of the love web and gets back together with Ho.
Camie Lo Ka Mei - Camie is Sa's adopted daughter (revealed via webcam) from Portugal. Her character is almost an exact copy of her mother's. She appears in the middle of the series as a beautiful, womanly 23-year-old girl who has just graduated from college and secretly has a child back in Portugal called Ronald. It turns out that she is a greedy, sneaky and selfish figure. She got this from her mother who was also greedy selfish and sneaky but her mother had learned from her mistakes after she found out that she was not blood related to her father and sister. Camie has a long love affair with Ka and once she's done with him, she has another one with Yuen. The affair ends with Camie being pregnant and forced to marry Yuen even though the baby was not his. She later has an abortion because the real father of the baby kept blackmailing her to give him money. Camie is constantly manipulated by Hung to work for her, but with her mother's constant scolding as well as subsequently saving her from a speeding van and the constant evils she sees Hung committing. During a press conference held by Hung, she betrayed Hong by revealing that Hung killed Grandma by pushing her down the stairs. In the end, she lives happily with the rest of the family and Yuen.

Others
Ling Chi Shun - Chi-Shun is a doctor who works with Chau at the hospital. A very cheerful, jovial man, he constantly cares for the babies he delivers and tells jokes. He strives to succeed for two people: his father, who worked very hard selling ice cream to pay for Ling Chi Sun's studies in England, and his girlfriend Wing Lam, who got him back on track and worked off his debts when he got addicted to Gambling and wasted a lot of his college money. He first meets Chau when they both see a pregnant woman at the mall and help her get to the hospital and successfully deliver her son, Lap. As he and Chau got closer to each other, they fell in love and soon Chi-Shun, Chau, and Wing Lam were stuck in a love triangle, and soon Chau dragged Ho into it too. Chi Shun went back and forth between the two women before deciding to leave for England with Wing Lam. However, when Wing Lam died, he lost confidence in everything and lied to Chau, saying he had gotten married with Wing Lam and was just working at the hospital temporarily. However, Chau found out the truth that Chi Shun wanted to spend Wing Lam's final days with her and soon they started over again. At the end of the series, Chi Shun officially hands over Chau back to Ho and they remain close friends.
Lin Chi Yung - Lin is a long-time worker at Hor's shop. Very loyal and skilled, he became Hor's apprentice when he was 13, but betrayed her when Hung bribed him to work for her with a salary so high yet so realistic so he could pay for his sister's college fees in Australia and still have enough to live off of. However, Hung finally stops using him and fires him, revealing to him her true side. Lin goes back to Hor and apologizes to her and is forgiven. Yung reveals to Grandma that her son Chuen (Jo's brother) did not die because Hor refused to help him pay off his gambling debts, but because his girlfriend had dumped him and left him with thousands of dollars of debt and he did not want to bother Hor, the only person he was grateful to, to give him more money. Eventually, Sa helps Lin Chi-Yung get a job in Australia as a branch manager for her friend's moon cake company. He is thrilled but tries to keep himself on Sa's good side (while she tries to con money from Gwan Lai), so she will not spoil his only chance to reunite with his sister, who is studying in Australia. However, when Sa revealed to Gwan Lai that Chung is staying with Hor after he ran away, and pushed the responsibility to Cho, Yung is pushed to his limits and revealed the truth, causing Sa to spoil this chance. Nonetheless, after the episode where Gwan Lai is convinced not to force Chung to stay with her, Hor forces Sa to go back on her words and return the chance to Yung. In Australia, he succeeds and becomes known as the "King of Moon Cakes". At the end of the series Yung comes back to Hong Kong for a visit. Yung's sister, Lin Tsui Ping, is a childhood playmate of Jo and Hor's children and is an apple to Hor's eye.
Eliza - Eliza was Ka and Yuet's demanding and vicious boss-from-hell when they were working in her PR firm in the beginning of the series. She tolerated Ka's laziness and incompetence in his work because of her close relationship with Yan Hong. However, in the end she fired Ka because he kissed her in her office, giving her the impression that Ka was sexually assaulting her. She however kept Yuet at her firm. Yuet was later fired because Eliza thought that Ka and her teamed up to make her look like a fool with a ringtone that Ka made using Eliza's shrill and demanding voice. Eliza also almost ruins Ka's first promotional function by stealing away his customers and misleading his clients with fallacy.
Yau Wing Lam - Wing Lam is Chi-Shun's girlfriend. Very loyal and worrisome about him, she stayed in England with him when he was in medical school to help him graduate when he got addicted to gambling. She even worked part-time to pay his gambling debts and the money he wasted. Once Chi-Shun graduated, Wing Lam went with him back to Hong Kong, where she worked as a saleswoman. Towards the end of the series, Wing Lam go back to England together in hopes of getting married, but Wing Lam dies of cancer before they can plan things out.
Yu Hak Keung - Yu is Hung's ex-husband and Chau's father. He dumped Hong and Chau when Chau was only 6 years old, but returned towards the middle-end of the series to help out Hong in all her difficulties because he felt he owed her. Ever-worrisome about Chau, it is his greatest wish to see her one last time. When he heard of her relationship with Ho, at first he thought he was just playing around with her, but eventually discovered Ho was a good boy. When Yu died towards the end of the series from cancer, Chau come to see him one last time, and Yu tells her he feels content leaving her with Ho.
Fong Shu Ting - Shu-ting is Ho's ex-girlfriend. She works as a stewardess in one of Hong Kong airline company, and she met Ho when he was flying to Thailand. Originally a happy couple, they broke up after multiple misunderstandings due to Ho's love and commitment to the family. Despite the misunderstandings, Ho and Shu-ting remain close friends and trust each other. When they have big secrets or troubling problems they would help each other. Shu-ting's elder sister is famous TV star Fong Shu-wing.
Kelvin Cheng Ka Lok - Kelvin is Hing's boyfriend, later husband. A kind, caring man, he is the perfect partner for Hing. Kelvin fell in love with Hing only days after she started her job, and immediately started taking the bus with her to work instead of driving, staying late at night at work just to keep Hing company, and learned sign language so that he could talk with her.

Viewership and accolades
The initial critical response for the series was excellent with the first episode receiving an average of 33 rating points with a peak of 42 and received peak points over 35 in later weeks. Like its predecessor, the 2-hour series finale premiered at a Hong Kong shopping centre, Discovery Park, in front of hundreds of guests and supporters. The finale was shown in the form of a variety show, 家好月圓慶團圓 and the viewership for that had reached 44 rating points. Viewership was higher than expected, with the final episode receiving an average of 47 rating points and a peak of 50 in the scene where Linda Chung and Michelle Yim's characters argued. As a result, Moonlight Resonance outperformed Heart of Greed, and is one of the highest-rated TVB series in viewership in the 2000s. Its rating tied with Dae Jang Geum, a Korean drama series that also garnered 50 points while it aired on TVB. The series received positive reviews from Hong Kong audiences but there were some who found the overall plot to be too similar to its predecessor. Moonlight Resonance was nominated for 18 TVB Anniversary Awards in 2008 and won a total of 6 awards.

Ratings for Moonlight Resonance

List of awards and nominations
TVB Anniversary Awards — Best Drama
Moonlight Resonance (溏心風暴之家好月圓) - Winner
TVB Anniversary Awards — Best Actor in a Leading Role
Ha Yu - Winner
Moses Chan - Top 5
Raymond Lam - Top 5
TVB Anniversary Awards — Best Actress in a Leading Role
Michelle Yim - Winner
Louise Lee - Top 5
Susanna Kwan - Top 10
TVB Anniversary Awards — Best Actor in a Supporting Role
Chow Chung Top 5
TVB Anniversary Awards — Best Actress in a Supporting Role
Tavia Yeung - Winner
Fala Chen - Top 5
Kate Tsui - Top 5
Lee Heung Kam - Top 5
TVB Anniversary Awards — My Most Favourite Male Character Role
Raymond Lam - Winner
Ha Yu - Top 5
TVB Anniversary Awards — My Most Favourite Female Character Role
Louise Lee - Winner
Susanna Kwan - Top 5
Fala Chen - Top 5
TVB Anniversary Awards — Most Vastly Improved Actress
Tavia Yeung - Top 5
Yahoo! Popular Searches Awards — Most Searched Television Series
Moonlight Resonance - Winner
Yahoo! Popular Searches Awards — Most Popular Searched Song
Raymond Lam - Winner
Yahoo! Popular Searches Awards — Most Searched Television Male Artist
Raymond Lam - Winner
The Next Magazine TV Awards 2009- Next Magazine Top Ten TV Programmes
Moonlight Resonance (溏心風暴之家好月圓)
The Next Magazine TV Awards 2009- Next Magazine Top Ten TV Artists
Raymond Lam (as Gan Wing Ho/甘永好)
The Next Magazine TV Awards 2009- Next Magazine Top Ten TV Artists
Tavia Yeung (as Suen Hou Yuet/孫皓月)
The Next Magazine TV Awards 2009- Next Magazine Top Ten TV Artists
Moses Chan (as Gan Wing Ga/甘永家)
The Next Magazine TV Awards 2009- Next Magazine Top Ten TV Artists
Michelle Yim (as Yan Hong/殷紅)
The Next Magazine TV Awards 2009- Next Magazine Top Ten TV Artists
Linda Chung (as Yu So Sum/於素心)
The Next Magazine TV Awards 2009- Next Magazine Top Ten TV Artists
Ha Yu (as Gan Tai Cho/甘泰祖)
The Next Magazine TV Awards 2009- Next Magazine Top Ten TV Artists
Louise Lee (as Chung Siu Ho/鍾笑荷)
Asian Television Awards 2009- Best Drama Performance by an Actress
Michelle Yim (as Yan Hong/殷紅)
Guangzhou Television Awards 2009- Best Actress in a Leading Role for a Television Drama
Michelle Yim (as Yan Hong/殷紅)

Sequel 
A sequel titled Heart and Greed was released in 2017 featuring some of the original cast members. The series was met with mostly negative reviews with audiences saying how times have changed and the type of plot being used is too similar to the first two series which has become old-fashioned after almost a decade.

International release

See also
Heart of Greed

DVD release

External links
K for TVB Screencaptures and Summary

References

TVB dramas
2008 Hong Kong television series debuts
2008 Hong Kong television series endings